The LINC complex (Linker of Nucleoskeleton and Cytoskeleton) is a protein complex associated with both inner and outer membranes of the nucleus. It is composed of SUN-domain proteins and KASH-domain proteins. The SUN-domain proteins are associated with both nuclear lamins and chromatin and cross the inner nuclear membrane. They interact with the KASH domain proteins in the perinuclear (lumen) space between the two membranes. The KASH domain proteins cross the outer nuclear membrane and interact with actin filaments, microtubule filaments (through dynein and kinesin motors), intermediate filaments (through spectrin), centrosomes and cytoplasmic organelles. The number of SUN-domain and KASH-domain proteins increased in evolution.

Function 
The function of the LINC complex appears to be in many cell activities. These include nuclear relocation/movement, moving meiotic chromosomes to find their homologues at leptotene/zygotene, attaching the centrosome to the outer nuclear membrane, formation of the nuclear pore complex, and responding to extracellular mechanical stimuli. LINC complex, by virtue of providing internal cell connectivity, is required for sensing of various mechanical stimuli including high frequency vibrations.

References

Protein complexes
Nuclear substructures
Cytoskeleton